Thomas Caldwell Kerr (15 August 1887 – 25 June 1956) was a member of the Queensland Legislative Assembly.

Biography
Kerr was born at Stanthorpe, Queensland, the son of John Kerr and his wife Mary (née Caldwell). He was educated at Sherwood State School and from 1905 to 1915 was a pearl sheller in the Dutch East Indies and Thursday Island. Later on he was a public accountant and auditor with Wright, Kerr and Co. in Brisbane.

He served in the First Australian Imperial Force in World War I, being based with the 31st Infantry Battalion.

On 8 November 1919 he married Lillian Violet Berry  (died 1954) in Brisbane and together had two sons and one daughter. One of their sons died in World War II while serving as a Spitfire Pilot in France. Kerr died in June 1956. He was cremated at Mt Thompson Crematorium and his ashes are in the columbarium wall at St Matthew's Anglican Church, Sherwood.

Public life
Kerr, a member of the UAP, and later the QPP and the Liberal Party, won the seat of Oxley in the Queensland Legislative Assembly in the 1943 by-election to replace Thomas Nimmo who had died in February of that year. He was to represent the seat until it was abolished before the 1950 state election.

He then moved to the new seat of Sherwood, holding it for six years until he retired from politics in 1956. He collapsed and died a month later in his Queen Street office.

References

Members of the Queensland Legislative Assembly
1887 births
1956 deaths
Liberal Party of Australia members of the Parliament of Queensland
United Australia Party members of the Parliament of Queensland
20th-century Australian politicians